is a Japanese kickboxer, currently competing in the super bantamweight divisions of RISE and Shoot boxing. He is the current Shoot Boxing Super Bantamweight (-55kg) champion.

As of January 2022 he was the #10 ranked Super Flyweight kickboxer in the world by Beyond Kick.

Professional career

SHOOTBOXING
After capturing three All Japan Shootboxing amateur titles, Yamada made his professional kickboxing debut against Kodai Nakada at SHOOT BOXING Hanayashiki Extreme.2 on August 24, 2019, at the age of 16. He won the fight by a first-round knockout. Yamada next faced Shota at SHOOT BOXING Hanayashiki Extreme.3 on October 27, 2019. He once again won by a first-round knockout. 

Yamada made an appearance at the fourth iteration of the SHOOT BOXING Hanayashiki Extreme as well, held on December 6, 2020, as he was booked to face Hiroki. He won the fight by unanimous decision, with two scorecards of 30–26 and one scorecard of 30–25.

Yamada faced the fifth-ranked Shootboxing super bantamweight contender Ryota Naito at Shoot Boxing 2021 act.4 on September 4, 2021. He won the fight by unanimous decision, with scores of 30–29, 30–28 and 30–27. 

Yamada was expected to face Aoshi at SHOOT BOXING 2021 Young Caesar Cup on December 19, 2021. Aoshi withdrew from the fight due to a rib injury he sustained during sparring and was replaced by Pon Sirilakgym, who stepped in on short-notice. Yamada won the fight by a second-round knockout.

Yamada faced the #1 ranked Shootboxing super bantamweight contender Shinta at SHOOT BOXING 2022 act.2 on April 10, 2022. He won the fight by a second-round knockout, as he floored his opponent with a right hook. Yamada scored a shoot point in the first round with a throw.

Yamada faced the former Shootboxing Japan bantamweight champion Shuto Sato at SHOOT BOXING 2022 act.4 on September 17, 2022. He won the fight by unanimous decision. Two of the judges scored the bout 29–25 in his favor, while the third judge awarded him a 29–26 scorecard. Yamada knocked Sato down with a right hook in the final minute of the opening round and scored a shoot point with a suplex as soon as the action resumed.

SHOOTBOXING/RISE
Yamada made his RISE debut against the once-defeated Shoa Arii at RISE WORLD SERIES / SHOOTBOXING-KINGS on December 25, 2022. He won the fight by a second-round knockout, stopping Arii with a counter right straight at the 1:21 minute mark of the round.

Yamada faced Seiki Ueyama for the Shoot Boxing Super Bantamweight (-55kg) title at SHOOT BOXING 2023 act.1 on February 12, 2023. He won the fight by a fifth-round knockout. Yamada floored his opponent with a left hook midway through the final round, which left Ueyama unable to rise from the canvas and required him to be carried out in a stretcher.

Titles and accomplishments

Professional
SHOOT BOXING
 2023 Shoot Boxing Super Bantamweight (-55kg) Champion

Amateur
Shoot Boxing
2012 All Japan Shootboxing Kids Upper-grade Championship
2012 All Japan Shootboxing Kids Upper-grade Tokyo Tournament Runner-up
2014 All Japan Shootboxing Junior -45kg Championship
2015 All Japan Shootboxing Junior -50kg Championship
2016 All Japan Shootboxing Junior -50kg Championship
MuayThai Open
2017 MuayThai Open -50kg Championship

Fight record

|- align="center"  bgcolor="#cfc"
| 2023-02-12|| Win ||align=left| Seiki Ueyama || SHOOT BOXING 2023 act.1|| Tokyo, Japan || KO (Left hook) || 5 || 1:49
|-
! style=background:white colspan=9 |

|-  style="background:#cfc;"
| 2022-12-25|| Win ||align=left| Shoa Arii || RISE WORLD SERIES / SHOOTBOXING-KINGS|| Tokyo, Japan || KO (Right cross) || 2 || 1:21

|-  style="background:#cfc;"
| 2022-09-17|| Win ||align=left| Shuto Sato  || SHOOT BOXING 2022 act.4|| Tokyo, Japan || Decision (Unanimous) || 3 || 3:00 

|-  style="background:#cfc;"
| 2022-04-10|| Win ||align=left| Shinta ||SHOOT BOXING 2022 act.2|| Tokyo, Japan || KO (Right hook)|| 1 ||2:00 

|-  style="background:#cfc;"
| 2021-12-19|| Win ||align=left| Pon Sirilakgym || SHOOT BOXING 2021 Young Caesar|| Tokyo, Japan ||KO (Body punches) || 2 ||2:52

|-  style="background:#cfc;"
| 2021-09-04|| Win ||align=left| Ryota Naito || Shoot Boxing 2021 act.4 || Tokyo, Japan || Decision (Unanmous)  || 3 ||3:00 

|-  style="text-align:center; background:#cfc;"
| 2021-02-07|| Win || align=left| Shohei || Shoot Boxing 2021 act.1 || Tokyo, Japan || KO (Punches)|| 3 || 2:01

|-  style="text-align:center; background:#cfc;"
| 2020-12-06|| Win || align=left| Hiroki|| SHOOT BOXING Hanayashiki Extreme.4|| Tokyo, Japan || Decision (Unanimous)|| 3 || 3:00

|-  style="text-align:center; background:#cfc;"
| 2019-10-27|| Win || align=left| Shota || SHOOT BOXING Hanayashiki Extreme.3|| Tokyo, Japan || KO (Punches + knees)|| 1 || 1:40

|-  style="text-align:center; background:#cfc;"
| 2019-08-24|| Win || align=left| Kodai Nakada || SHOOT BOXING Hanayashiki Extreme.2|| Tokyo, Japan || KO (3 Knockdowns)|| 1 || 1:46

|-
| colspan=9 | Legend:    

|-  style="text-align:center; background:#cfc;"
| 2019-06-02|| Win || align=left| Reo Yoshida || KAMINARIMON || Tokyo, Japan || Decision (Unanimous)|| 2 || 2:00

|-  style="text-align:center; background:#cfc;"
| 2018-11-18|| Win || align=left| Rintaro Yokota || SHOOT BOXING Hanayashiki Extreme.2|| Tokyo, Japan || KO (3 Knockdowns)|| 2 || 1:18

|-  style="text-align:center; background:#cfc;"
| 2018-10-14|| Win || align=left| Juki Sakamoto|| SHOOT BOXING Young Caesar act.4|| Tokyo, Japan || Decision (Unanimous)|| 3 || 2:00

|-  style="text-align:center; background:#cfc;"
| 2018-08-05|| Win || align=left| Ryomu Endo || SHOOT BOXING Young Caesar act.3|| Tokyo, Japan || Ext.R Decision (Unanimous)|| 4 || 2:00

|-  style="text-align:center; background:#cfc;"
| 2018-05-13|| Win || align=left| Kenta Hayami|| SHOOT BOXING Young Caesar act.2|| Tokyo, Japan || TKO|| 2 || 1:12

|-  style="text-align:center; background:#cfc;"
| 2018-03-11 || Win ||align=left| Ryu Hanaoka || Shootboxing Amateur ||  Tokyo, Japan ||Decision (Unanimous) ||2 || 2:00

|- align="center"  bgcolor="#fbb"
| 2017-12-16|| Loss ||align=left| Taisei Kondo ||Amateur Shootboxing || Tokyo, Japan || Decision || ||

|-  style="text-align:center; background:#cfc;"
| 2017-09-03 || Win ||align=left| Ryu Hanaoka || NJKF Explosion 12 ||  Tokyo, Japan ||Decision || 2 || 1:30 

|- align="center"  bgcolor="#cfc"
| 2017-08-06|| Win ||align=left| Suzuki ||Amateur Shootboxing || Tokyo, Japan || KO|| || 

|- align="center"  bgcolor="#cfc"
| 2017-07-09|| Win ||align=left| Seiya Namai || MuayThai Open 39 || Tokyo, Japan || Decision  || ||
|-
! style=background:white colspan=9 |

|- align="center"  bgcolor="#fbb"
| 2017-05-28|| Loss ||align=left| Kyosuke Zaibe||J-NETWORK Amateur Tournament, Final || Tokyo, Japan || Decision (Unanimous) || || 

|- align="center"  bgcolor="#cfc"
| 2017-05-28|| Win ||align=left| Ichie Nakamura ||J-NETWORK Amateur Tournament, Semi Final || Tokyo, Japan || Decision (Unanimous) || || 

|- align="center"  bgcolor="#cfc"
| 2017-05-13|| Win ||align=left| Hiromu Abe ||Amateur Shootboxing || Tokyo, Japan || KO ||1 ||1:17 

|- align="center"  bgcolor="#cfc"
| 2017-05-13|| Win ||align=left| Sota Kanai ||Amateur Shootboxing || Tokyo, Japan || Decision (Unanimous)||2 ||3:00 

|- align="center"  bgcolor="#cfc"
| 2017-04-02|| Win ||align=left| Iori Maeda || MuayThai Open 38 || Tokyo, Japan || Decision  || ||
|-
! style=background:white colspan=9 |

|- align="center"  bgcolor="#cfc"
| 2016-12-18|| Win ||align=left| Taisei Kondo ||All Japan Amateur Shootboxing Championship || Tokyo, Japan || Decision (Unanimous) || ||
|-
! style=background:white colspan=9 |

|-  style="text-align:center; background:#cfc;"
| 2016-08-21 || Win||align=left| Hyuga Umemoto || Amateur Shootboxing || Tokyo, Japan || Ext.R TKO ||  || 

|- align="center"  bgcolor="#cfc"
| 2016-01-24|| Win ||align=left| Ryoga Doi || Amateur Shootboxing || Tokyo, Japan || Decision (Unanimous) || ||

|- align="center"  bgcolor="#cfc"
| 2015-09-27|| Win ||align=left| Raito Tamagawa ||All Japan Amateur Shootboxing Championship || Tokyo, Japan ||  || ||
|-
! style=background:white colspan=9 |

|-
| colspan=9 | Legend:

See also
 List of male kickboxers

References

Living people
2003 births
Japanese male kickboxers
Sportspeople from Tokyo
21st-century Japanese people